Clubul Sportiv Metalurgistul Cugir commonly known as Metalurgistul Cugir, is a Romanian football club based in Cugir, Alba County, currently playing in the Liga III. The club was formerly known as Metalurgistul Cugir.

Honours
Liga II
Best finish: 5th 1974–75
Liga III
Winners (3): 1981–82, 1989–90, 2020–21
Runners-up (6): 1985–86, 1988–89, 2003–04, 2014–15, 2016–17, 2021–22
 Liga IV – Alba County
Winners (1): 2012–13
Runners-up (1): 2011–12
Liga V – Alba County
Winners (1): 2009–10
Runners-up (1): 2008–09

Players

First team squad

Out on loan

Club Officials

Board of directors

Current technical staff

League history

References

External links

Association football clubs established in 1939
Football clubs in Alba County
Liga II clubs
Liga III clubs
Liga IV clubs
1939 establishments in Romania